The Shabo are an ethnic group of southwestern Ethiopia. They call themselves "Sabu" and are sometimes called "Mikeyir" by their neighbors. Their language is of uncertain classification and shows some similarities with the Nilo-Saharan, particularly Koman, languages. The Shabo live in several dispersed settlements in the regional states of the Gambela Region and the Southern Nations, Nationalities, and People's Region, surrounded by Majangir and Shekkacho peoples, with whom they intermarry. The former have heavily influenced Shabo culture. The Shabo have adopted several customs and elements of material culture (including pottery) from the Majangir.

  
Their livelihood is based on slash-and-burn or fire-fallow agriculture, although hunting with spears and dogs, fishing, and gathering wild roots and berries plays an important role in their economy. Bush meat is transported in a net, called kenken, from the forest to the house and markets. The Shabo live in small cleared plots in the middle of dense forests, which are being gradually deforested by the coffee agribusiness. Their small huts, made with pieces of wood and palm-leaves, stand in the middle of the cleared area, surrounded by haphazard cultivations of sorghum and corn. After six or seven years, the plot is left to fallow and a new plot is opened nearby. As among the Majangir, Shabo family units are well spaced out. There are no villages in the usual sense of the term. The Shabo have traditionally exchanged game, fish, skins and honey with the people of the Ethiopian Highlands.

The Shabo claim that Juku (God) created them in the same area that they occupy today and that other groups (like the Majangir and Shekkacho) arrived later to the region. The Shabo have different clans and exogamy is mandatory (either with people from other clans or from other ethnic groups). Traditionally, grooms had to give the bride's father an axe and a spear (for hunting in the forest and gathering honey) in order to get married. The bride's mother received bracelets.

References

Anbessa, T. and P. Unseth, 1989. "Toward the classification of Shabo (Mikeyir)." In M. Lionel Bender (ed.): Topics in Nilo-Saharan linguistics. Nilo-Saharan, 3. Hamburg: Helmut Buske, pp. 405–18.

External links
 Ethnologue report

Ethnic groups in Ethiopia